Carl II may refer to:

 Charles VIII of Sweden (1409–1470) or Carl II, King of Sweden (and of Norway as Carl I) 
 Karl Eusebius, Prince of Liechtenstein (1611–1684)
 Charles XIII of Sweden or Carl XIII (1748–1818), also Carl II of Norway